Molly Mason is an American musician and composer and performs as a duo Jay & Molly with her husband Jay Ungar.  Jay's composition, Ashokan Farewell, became the title theme of Ken Burns' The Civil War  on PBS. The soundtrack won a Grammy and Ashokan Farewell was nominated for an Emmy.

Mason grew up in Washington state. She plays traditional American fiddle and acoustic bass guitar.
She is married to Jay Ungar, whom she had first met during the 1970s. Jay & Molly continue to perform as a duo, with their band, Swingology, and as the Jay Ungar and Molly Mason Family Band with Jay's daughter Ruth Ungar (her mother is Lyn Hardy) and Ruthy's husband Michael Merenda.

In 1992, Ungar and Mason provided the soundtrack to the acclaimed documentary film Brother's Keeper, released as a music CD entitled Waltzing with You (1998).

They have contributed soundtracks to several of Ken Burns documentaries.

They have performed on Great Performances, A Prairie Home Companion, All Things Considered. They've had the honor of performing at the White House for two sitting Presidents.

In 2006, they headlined the Northwest Folklife Festival in Seattle.

References

 Catskill Cultural Center Saved, and Renewed, Thanks to a Fiddler’s Tune By Dennis Gaffney. The New York Times.  May 12, 2013

External links
 Jay Ungar & Molly Mason
 Folk Alley Sessions:  Ashokan Farewell, Kent State University, Ohio, 2011.
 Jay Ungar (fiddle) & Molly Mason (guitar, piano) - Ashokan, Fiddle Hell Online Jam #27 July 12, 2020

American folk musicians
American fiddlers
American women composers
21st-century American composers
Angel Records artists
Year of birth missing (living people)
Living people
21st-century American women musicians
21st-century American violinists
21st-century women composers